The Football League play-offs for the 1996–97 season were held in May 1997, with the finals taking place at the old Wembley Stadium in London. The play-off semi-finals will be played over two legs and will be contested by the teams who finish in 3rd, 4th, 5th and 6th place in the Football League First Division and Football League Second Division and the 4th, 5th, 6th and 7th placed teams in the Football League Third Division table. The winners of the semi-finals will go through to the finals, with the winner of the matches gaining promotion for the following season.

First Division

Semi-finals
First leg

Second leg

Ipswich Town 3–3 Sheffield United on aggregate. Sheffield United won on away goals.

Crystal Palace won 4–3 on aggregate.

Final

Second Division

Semi-finals
First leg

Second leg

Brentford won 4–2 on aggregate.

Crewe Alexandra won 4–3 on aggregate.

Final

Third Division

Semi-finals
First leg

Second leg

Swansea City won 3–0 on aggregate.

Northampton Town won 4–2 on aggregate.

Final

External links
Football League website

 
English Football League play-offs